Paloma Kwiatkowski (born May 29, 1994) is a Canadian film and television actress. She is best known for her roles as Thalia Grace in Percy Jackson: Sea of Monsters (2013) and Cody in Bates Motel. She also received two Leo Award nominations and won once in 2018.

Personal life 
Kwiatkowski was born in Vancouver. She lives in Burnaby, British Columbia. Her parents moved to Canada from Poland. As a high school student at Templeton Secondary School, Kwiatkowski took part in theatre, improv, and film-making. She was captain of the improv team which competed in the Canadian Improv Games and received a scholarship to an acting program. Having graduated from high school in 2012, she was accepted into Simon Fraser University's film program but decided to defer her enrollment.

Career 
In April 2012, it was announced that Kwiatkowski had been cast as the demi-god Thalia Grace, daughter of Zeus in Percy Jackson: Sea of Monsters (2013).
Her portrayal was met with mixed reviews mostly due to the fact she had a small role. 
Kwiatkowski plays a main role in Sitting on the Edge of Marlene, a 2014 film adaptation of a young adult book by Canadian author Billie Livingston. In August 2013, she was cast in the recurring role of Cody Brennan in the second season of Bates Motel. In May 2014, she joined the cast of an indie film, Who's Driving Doug.

Filmography

Film

Television

Awards and nominations

References

External links 
 

1994 births
Canadian film actresses
Canadian people of Polish descent
Living people
Actresses from Vancouver
Canadian television actresses
21st-century Canadian actresses